Domiodol is a mucolytic and expectorant. It has been marketed in Italy by Maggioni under the trade name Mucolitico Maggioni and sold in syrup, sachet, and tablet form, with a dosage of 60mg three to four times daily in adults. Contraindications include severe renal or hepatic insufficiency.

References 

Antitussives
Organoiodides
Primary alcohols
Dioxolanes